The 2008–09 season was the 109th season in Società Sportiva Lazio's history and their 21st consecutive season in the top-flight of Italian football. Lazio finished in 10th place in Serie A, however, won the Coppa Italia this season.

Club

Management

Other information

Squad

First team
As of September 20, 2008

For all transfers and loans pertaining to Lazio for the current season, please see; summer 2008 transfers.

Double passports
  Juan Pablo Carrizo
  Mauro Zárate
  Mourad Meghni
  Cristian Ledesma
  Cribari
  Christian Manfredini
  Fernando Muslera

Non-EU players
  Aleksandar Kolarov
  Matuzalém
  Stephen Makinwa
  Goran Pandev

Competitions

Serie A

League table

Results summary

Matches

Coppa Italia

Top scorers
  Mauro Zárate 13 (2)
  Goran Pandev 9
  Tommaso Rocchi 9
  Pasquale Foggia 2
  Cristian Ledesma 2
  Stefano Mauri 2

Transfers

In

Out

Loaned in

Loaned out

Estimated transfer totals
Does not take into account undisclosed fees.

Expenditure
Summer:   €10.2 million

Winter:  €0

Total:  €10.2 million

Income
Summer:  €12.5 million

Winter:  €0

Total:  €12.5 million

Overall
Summer:  €2.3 million

Winter:  €0

Total:   €2.3 million

References

External links
S.S. Lazio Official website 

S.S. Lazio seasons
Lazio